Philip Wright is an English actor, known for playing DC Lillie in Prime Suspect and DI Steve Thompson in the BBC soap opera EastEnders.

Personal life
Wright lives in South East London with his wife and children; his son is the British cyclist Fred Wright.

Filmography
Prime Suspect (1992–1993)
Dangerous Lady (1995)
The Bill (1996, 1997, 1999, 2002, 2006)
The Wings Of The Dove (1997)
Casualty (2001, 2009)
Holby City (2005)
Doctors (2005, 2009, 2011)
Dalziel and Pascoe episode "Heads You Lose" (2005)
The Flying Scotsman (2006)
Our Girl (2013)
Line Of Duty (2014)
Silent Witness (2015)
Doctor Foster (2017)
Call the Midwife (2019)
Casualty (2019–present)
EastEnders (2019–2021)
Save Me (2020)

References

External links
 

20th-century English male actors
21st-century English male actors
English male film actors
English male television actors
Living people
Place of birth missing (living people)
Year of birth missing (living people)